Praise 87.9 (87.9 FM) is a radio station in the Cayman Islands in the British West Indies. The station is owned by the Cayman Islands Conference of Seventh-Day Adventist. It airs a Christian radio format. The station was founded by evangelist Everton Malcolm, a lay member of Newlands Adventist Church.

The station's license was issued on 15 June 2006 and amended on 6 March 2008.

References

External links
Cayman Islands Conference of Seventh-Day Adventist

Radio stations in the Cayman Islands
Radio stations established in 2006
Christian radio stations in North America
Seventh-day Adventist media
2006 establishments in the Cayman Islands